Licht ("Light") is a solo studio album by the German pop singer Nena, released on 16 October 2020, over 5 years after Nena's previous studio album, Oldschool. Licht involves vocal, songwriting and production contributions from all four of Nena's surviving children as well as from the father of two of them, her longstanding partner Philipp Palm. One week after its release, it entered the German album charts at number three.

Background and origins

Nena started work on Licht two years before its release by writing the song "Wandern". According to Nena, the main theme of the album is learning from life's "journey" and that although anger and tension are inevitable, everything can work out fine if we "completely redesign our coexistence with the planet for the benefit of all involved". Released in the midst of the COVID-19 pandemic, Nena aroused controversy a few days before the album's release with a post on social media stating that her "deep faith in God and trust in life" enabled her to "break down the scare tactics pouring in from outside," which some commentators construed as evidence of her being a "COVID-denier". Nena's management team rebutted this charge although they did say that the singer was critical of some measures, such as compulsory mask-wearing for children and family members being denied access to dying relatives.

Reception

Initial reviews of the album were mixed.

Laut.de wrote that, although the album contained "pleasantly surprising beautiful synth melodies" it was prevented from being a "good pop album" by Nena's "annoying 'everything will be fine' mantra". Like Laut.de, T-Online also made reference to Nena's coronavirus comments but dismissed speculation that the album would show Nena to be a COVID-denier or taken in by conspiracy theories.  Instead, the review concludes the album captured the Zeitgeist by "sending a positive signal in a rather gloomy period" although it was not a "beacon in Nena's discography". On the other hand, an entirely positive early review appeared in Sounds and Books, which described the album as joining the "long list of compelling Nena albums" and that "she keeps getting better".

Later reviews of the album were more consistently positive. Almost three months after the album's release, Swedish online magazine JPS Media compared Licht favourably with Nena's work in her 1980s heyday. The article cited a number of tracks, including the "life affirming title track, the Summer pop track (Karawane) and 'Auf einmal warst du da'…the groovy piano ballad taking Nena outside her vocal comfort zone," as evidence of Nena, "now singing better and with more nuanced expression…having aged pleasantly in more than the most obvious way." Published at the same time as the JPS Media review, Swiss online magazine Blue News also assessed Licht in the context of Nena's life and career. Giving Nena credit for emerging through the "wonderful highs and terrible lows" of her life "still on stage….a little bit shrill, wild, non-conformist and full of energy," the article describes Licht as a "great pop album" which nearly three months after its release, "I still listen to from start to finish."

Chart performance

Licht entered the German album charts one week after its release at number 3. It also entered the Swiss and Austrian album charts at numbers 9 and 11 respectively.

Nena released three singles from Licht prior to the album's release, none of which charted.

Track listing

Charts

References

External links
 

2020 albums
Nena albums
German-language albums